The 2011–12 season was the 110th season of football for Norwich City. It was their first season in the Premier League for six years following promotion from the Championship in 2010–11 as runners-up.

Norwich City ended the season in 12th place after winning their last league game 2–0 against Aston Villa on 13 May 2012. They collected 47 points from 38 games.

Club staff

Backroom staff

Board of directors

Players

Current squad

Out on loan

Transfers

In

Out

Statistics

Appearances, goals and cards

Last updated on 14 April 2012.
(Substitute appearances in brackets)

Captains

Accounts for all competitions.

Top goalscorers

Lists at most top 10 goalscorers only.
Legend: LG = Premier League; L. Cup = League Cup
Classification: 1. Goals in total 2. Goals in league 3. Goals in FA Cup 4. Goals in League Cup 5. Most recently scored

Penalties awarded
Last updated on 24 March 2012.

Competitions

Pre-season
Note: this section relates to first team friendlies only.

Premier League

Table

Results by round

Premier League

FA Cup

League Cup

References

Norwich City F.C. seasons
Norwich City